Putnam County is a county located in the northwestern part of the U.S. state of Ohio. As of the 2020 census, the population was 34,451. Its county seat is Ottawa. The county was created in 1820 and later organized in 1834. Its name is in honor of Israel Putnam, a colonial hero in the French and Indian War, who served as a general in the American Revolutionary War. The Blanchard River, which passes through the county, was a key transportation route for early European-American settlers.

Geography
The Blanchard River passes through the county.

Adjacent counties
 Henry County (north)
 Hancock County (east)
 Allen County (south)
 Van Wert County (southwest)
 Paulding County (west)
 Defiance County (northwest)
 Wood County (northeast, at a single point)

Demographics

2000 census
As of the census of 2000, there were 34,726 people, 12,200 households, and 9,308 families living in the county. The population density was 72 people per square mile (28/km2). There were 12,753 housing units at an average density of 26 per square mile (10/km2). The racial makeup of the county was 96.26% White, 0.17% Black or African American, 0.15% Native American, 0.18% Asian, 0.01% Pacific Islander, 2.51% from other races, and 0.73% from two or more races. 4.38% of the population were Hispanic or Latino of any race.

There were 12,200 households, out of which 39.20% had children under the age of 18 living with them, 64.90% were married couples living together, 7.40% had a female householder with no husband present, and 23.70% were non-families. 21.30% of all households were made up of individuals, and 10.50% had someone living alone who was 65 years of age or older. The average household size was 2.81 and the average family size was 3.29.

In the county, the population was spread out, with 29.70% under the age of 18, 8.30% from 18 to 24, 28.10% from 25 to 44, 20.60% from 45 to 64, and 13.30% who were 65 years of age or older. The median age was 35 years. For every 100 females there were 98.50 males. For every 100 females age 18 and over, there were 97.00 males.

The median income for a household in the county was $46,426, and the median income for a family was $52,859. Males had a median income of $36,548 versus $23,963 for females. The per capita income for the county was $18,680. About 4.00% of families and 5.60% of the population were below the poverty line, including 6.40% of those under age 18 and 9.80% of those age 65 or over.

2010 census
As of the 2010 United States Census, there were 34,499 people, 12,872 households, and 9,556 families living in the county. The racial makeup of the county was 95.7% white, 0.3% black or African American, 0.2% Asian, 0.2% American Indian, 2.7% from other races, and 0.9% from two or more races. Those of Hispanic or Latino origin made up 5.5% of the population. In terms of ancestry, 65.6% identified as German, 7.8% were Irish, 7.3% were American, 4.7% were English, 2.4% were French, 1.8% were Swiss, 1.7% were Dutch, 1.6% were Italian, 1.4% were Scottish, 1.0% were Welsh, 0.8% were Hungarian and 0.8% were Polish.

Of the 12,872 households, 35.0% had children under the age of 18 living with them, 62.9% were married couples living together, 7.4% had a female householder with no husband present, 25.8% were non-families, and 22.5% of all households were made up of individuals. The average household size was 2.66 and the average family size was 3.13. The median age was 39.0 years.

The median income for a household in the county was $56,573 and the median income for a family was $65,882. Males had a median income of $44,417 versus $33,200 for females. The per capita income for the county was $24,023. About 5.8% of families and 7.1% of the population were below the poverty line, including 9.8% of those under age 18 and 7.0% of those age 65 or over.

Politics
Prior to 1940, Putnam County was a Democratic Party county stronghold presidential elections, with James M. Cox in 1920 being the only Democrat to lose it before that year. But starting with the 1940 election, it has become a Republican stronghold. The only 2 Democrats to win the county since then are Harry S. Truman in 1948 and Lyndon B. Johnson in 1964.

|}

Education
The Putnam County Board of Education operates nine separate school districts county-wide.
 Columbus Grove Local School, Putnam County, Ohio
 St. Anthony's Elementary
 Continental Local School, Putnam County, Ohio
 Fort Jennings Local School District, Putnam County, Ohio
 Kalida Local School District, Putnam County, Ohio
 Leipsic Local School District, Putnam County, Ohio
 Leipsic St. Mary's Elementary
 McComb Local School District, Hancock County, Ohio (mostly in Hancock County)
 Miller City-New Cleveland Local School District, Putnam County, Ohio
 Ottawa-Glandorf Local School District, Putnam County, Ohio
 St. Peter and Paul Elementary
 Loving Care Daycare and Preschool
 Ottawa-Glandorf Alternative School
 Ottoville Local School District, Putnam County, Ohio
 Pandora-Gilboa Local School, Putnam County, Ohio

Other villages across the county are served by one or more of these districts above in the district's zone area.

Communities

Villages

 Belmore
 Cloverdale
 Columbus Grove
 Continental
 Dupont
 Fort Jennings
 Gilboa
 Glandorf
 Kalida
 Leipsic
 Miller City
 Ottawa (county seat)
 Ottoville
 Pandora
 West Leipsic

Townships

 Blanchard
 Greensburg
 Jackson
 Jennings
 Liberty
 Monroe
 Monterey
 Ottawa
 Palmer
 Perry
 Pleasant
 Riley
 Sugar Creek
 Union
 Van Buren

https://web.archive.org/web/20160715023447/http://www.ohiotownships.org/township-websites

Census-designated place
 Vaughnsville

Unincorporated communities

 Avis
 Cascade
 Crosswell
 Cuba
 Dorninton
 Douglas
 Elm Center
 Hartsburg
 Hector
 Jones City
 Kieferville
 Muntanna
 New Cleveland
 North Creek
 Prentiss
 Rice
 Rimer
 Rushmore
 Townwood
 Wisterman

Putnam County Fair

The Putnam County Fair is located in Ottawa, Ohio and the slogan is "A Blue Ribbon Event." At the fairgrounds, there are several activities from playing games, to riding rides, or just eating the food. The Putnam County Fair usually runs the last week of June.

See also
 National Register of Historic Places listings in Putnam County, Ohio

Footnotes

Further reading
 Marguerite Calvin, Death, Administration, Marriage, and Miscellaneous Notices from the Kalida Venture, Putnam County, Ohio, 1845-1854. Ottawa, OH: Putnam County District Library, 1987.
 Marguerite Calvin, Newspaper Notices from the Kalida Venture, Putnam County, Ohio 1845-1852: A Supplement to Deaths, Administration, Marriage, and Miscellaneous Notices. Ottawa, OH: Putnam County District Library, 1993.
 Marguerite Calvin, Newspaper Notices from the Kalida Sentinel, Putnam County, Ohio, 1861-1866. Ottawa, OH: Putnam County District Library, 1991.
 Marguerite Calvin and David S. Adams, People and Places: Putnam County, Ohio, 1800-1900. Ottawa, OH: M. Calvin, 1981.
 Audrey S. Carroll, Putnam County Pioneer Association: Centennial History, 1873-1973, Putnam County, Ohio.  Columbus Grove, OH: Heffner Printing Co., 1973.
 Imogene Elwer, Chronicles of the Past: A History of Putnam County, Ohio. n.c.: n.p., 1990s.
 Delbert L. Gratz, Historical and Genealogical Sketch of the Swiss Mennonites of Allen and Putnam Counties, Ohio. Columbus, OH: Ohio Historical Society, 1940.
 Henry Howe, History of Putnam County, Ohio, 1820-1899. Knightstown, IN: The Bookmark, 1977.
 George D. Kinder, History of Putnam Country, Ohio: Its Peoples, Industries, and Institutions: With Biographical Sketches of Representative Citizens and Genealogical Records of Many of the Old Families. Indianapolis, IN: B.F. Bowen and Co., 1915.
 Putnam County Genealogical Society, Putnam County, Ohio Cemeteries. Ottawa, OH: Putnam County Genealogical Society, 1993.
 Putnam County Historical Society, The Blizzard of 1978 in Putnam County, Ohio. Kalida, OH: Putnam County Historical Society, 1978.
 Putnam County Historical Society, History of Putnam County, Ohio, 1880: Illustrated, Containing Outline Map, Fifteen Farm Maps and a History of the County; Lithographic Views of Buildings — Public and Private; Portraits of Prominent Men; General statistics; Miscellaneous Matters, etc. Mt. Vernon, IN: Windmill Publications, 1995.
 Putnam County Historical Society, Putnam County Pioneer Reminiscences, 1878-1887. Kalida, OH: Putnam County Historical Society, 1981.
 Daniel W. Seitz and O.C. Talbot, The Putnam County Atlas, 1895: Containing Sectional Outline Maps of the County...Farm Maps of the Fifteen Townships...Together with Maps of All the Towns Reduced to Single Page Size... Ottawa, OH: D.W. Seitz and O.C. Talbot, 1895.
 Mary L. Sheeley, Putnam County, Ohio One-Room Schools. Kalida, OH: Putnam County Historical Society, 1985.
 Marjorie Waterfield, The Ledger Tells the Story, 1811-1879: The History of the Irwin family of Putnam County, Ohio. Bowling Green, OH: M. Waterfield, 1997.
 A Portrait and Biographical Record of Allen and Putnam Counties, Ohio: Containing Biographical Sketches of Many Prominent and Representative Citizens, Together with Biographies and Portraits of All the Presidents of the United States, and Biographies of the Governors of Ohio. Chicago: A.W. Bowen & Company, 1896.

External links

 Official Putnam County website

 
1834 establishments in Ohio
Populated places established in 1834